Neuroscience Research Australia (or NeuRA) is an independent medical research institute based in Sydney, Australia. Previously called the Prince of Wales Medical Research Institute, the institute relaunched as Neuroscience Research Australia on 1 June 2010. NeuRA is accredited by the National Health and Medical Research Council.

Neuroscience Research Australia is made up of approximately 260 researchers specialising in research on the brain and nervous system in health and disease.

The current executive director is Professor Peter R Schofield.

Research activity

NeuRA’s research activity is organised into five themes:

 Ageing and neurodegeneration: Alzheimer's disease, frontotemporal dementia and other types of dementia, Parkinson's disease, motor neuron disease, ageing research in indigenous populations, stroke rehabilitation
 Brain function and imaging: brain mapping for research and clinical use, on-site MRI scanning, autism
 Neural injury: spinal cord injury, assessment and prevention of road trauma in children
 Mental illness: schizophrenia, bipolar disorder, depression 
 Sensation, movement, balance and falls: human movement, fatigue, sleep apnoea, balance and vision, neural control of muscles, falls in older adults, chronic pain

NeuRA also houses research centres, including the Sydney Brain Bank and Genetic Repositories Australia.

History

NeuRA was established in 1991 by Professor Ian McCloskey, Professor David Burke, Professor Simon Gandevia and Professor Erica Potter with the support of the Eastern Sydney Area Health Service (now South Eastern Sydney and Illawarra Area Health Service) and the University of New South Wales.

In 1993 the institute was established as an independent, not-for-profit company and researchers moved into buildings on the site of the old Randwick Chest Hospital, next to the Prince of Wales Hospital in Randwick. It was officially opened on 8 November 1993 by the Commonwealth Minister for Health Graham Richardson and the NSW Minister for Health Ron Phillips.

On 15 November 2000, the Premier of New South Wales, Bob Carr, officially opened the new sections of the institute. In June 2009 the Minister for Science and Medical Research Jodi McKay opened the Prince Henry Wing extension.

In March 2010, the NSW government gave planning approval to the concept and project plans for a Neuroscience Research Precinct to be built on the existing site. Building works began on the first phase of the project in March 2010; with the first stage of  designed by COX Architecture completed in 2013 at a cost of 40 million.

The completed Neuroscience Research Precinct will provide six stories of laboratory and clinical research space, providing  of floor space and housing up to 700 researchers, delivered in four stages.

In 2018, NeuRA formed a cooperative partnership of four clinical, educational and research allies, including Black Dog Institute, South Eastern Sydney Local Health District (SESLHD) and UNSW Sydney to create Mindgardens Neuroscience Network which became the largest collaboration between researchers and clinicians in the Southern Hemisphere on brain disorders. Professor Peter Schofield became Mindgardens' Interim Co-CEO.

In November 2018, NeuRA’s team of neuroscientists led by George Paxinos reported a finding of a new region of the human brain which they called the endorestiform nucleus. The group adopted an innovative enhanced staining method.

See also

Health in Australia

References

External links 
 Neuroscience Research Australia website

Neuroscience research centres in Australia
Medical research institutes in Sydney
1991 establishments in Australia
Philip Cox buildings
Research institutes established in 1991
Randwick, New South Wales